Silent Trail is a 1928 American silent Western film directed by J.P. McGowan and starring Bob Custer, Peggy Montgomery and John Lowell.

Cast
 Bob Custer
 Peggy Montgomery
 John Lowell
 J.P. McGowan
 Mack V. Wright
 Nancy A. Lee
 Jack Ponder

References

Bibliography
 John J. McGowan. J.P. McGowan: Biography of a Hollywood Pioneer. McFarland, 2005.

External links
 

1928 films
1928 Western (genre) films
Films directed by J. P. McGowan
American black-and-white films
Silent American Western (genre) films
1920s English-language films
1920s American films